David Rivkin is the name of:

David B. Rivkin (born 1956), American attorney and conservative commentator
David W. Rivkin (born 1955), Litigation Partner at Debevoise & Plimpton LLP
David Z (music producer) (born c. 1953), American music producer and musician